Russell William Fry (born January 31, 1985) is an American politician and lawyer serving as the U.S. representative for South Carolina's 7th congressional district since 2023.

A member of the Republican Party, Fry represented the 106th District in the South Carolina House of Representatives from 2015 to 2023. In 2018, he was appointed to the position of Majority Chief Whip for the 122nd South Carolina General Assembly.

Career

South Carolina House of Representatives
In May 2015, State Representative Nelson Hardwick announced his resignation after House leadership investigated sexual harassment allegations against him. Fry ran in the special election for Hardwick's seat. He won a plurality of the vote in the Republican primary in July and advanced to a runoff against Tyler Servant. Fry won the runoff, and was unopposed in the general election.

U.S. House of Representatives

Elections

2022 

In the aftermath of the 2021 United States Capitol attack, Tom Rice, who was serving as the U.S. representative for South Carolina's 7th congressional district, voted in favor of impeaching President Donald Trump. Fry criticized Rice for his vote, and said he was considering running against him in 2022. In August 2021, Fry announced that he would challenge Rice in the 2022 election, emphasizing his opposition to Trump's impeachment. On February 1, 2022, Trump endorsed Fry. In the June 14 Republican primary, Fry defeated Rice by 26.6 percentage points. On November 8, Fry was elected to Congress with 64.9% of the vote, defeating Democratic nominee Daryl Scott.

Tenure 
Fry was elected to serve as the president of the congressional freshman class during orientation week. On January 16, 2023, it was announced that Fry would serve on the House Judiciary Committee.

Syria 
In 2023, Fry was among 47 Republicans to vote in favor of H.Con.Res. 21, which directed President Joe Biden to remove U.S. troops from Syria within 180 days.

Electoral history

Personal life
Fry is a Baptist.

References

External links
 Congressman Russell Fry official U.S. House website
 Russell Fry for Congress campaign website
 

|-

1985 births
Living people
21st-century American politicians
Baptists from South Carolina
People from Horry County, South Carolina
Republican Party members of the South Carolina House of Representatives
Republican Party members of the United States House of Representatives from South Carolina
University of South Carolina alumni